George Samuel Clason (November 7, 1874 – April 5, 1957) was  an  American author. He is most often associated with his book   The Richest Man in Babylon which was first published in 1926.

Early life and education 
Clason was born in Louisiana, Missouri. He attended the University of Nebraska. He served in the United States Army during the Spanish–American War.

Career
Clason started two companies, the Clason Map Company of Denver, Colorado and the Clason Publishing Company. The Clason Map Company was the first to publish a road atlas of the United States and Canada, but did not survive the Great Depression.

Clason is best known for writing a series of informational pamphlets about being thrifty and how to achieve financial success. He started writing the pamphlets in 1926, using parables that were set in ancient Babylon. Banks and insurance companies began to distribute the parables, and the most famous ones were compiled into the book The Richest Man in Babylon - The Success Secrets of the Ancients.   He is credited with coining the phrase, "Pay yourself first".

Personal life
Clason moved to Denver in 1900. He had two children who were also authors Clyde B. Clason and Robin Clason McKown. He was married twice, to Ida Ann Venable and Anna Burt. 

He moved to Napa, California in 1949 and died there on April 5, 1957.

References

External links
 

1874 births
1957 deaths
University of Nebraska alumni
American military personnel of the Spanish–American War
American finance and investment writers
People from Louisiana, Missouri
Writers from Missouri
[[Book:The Richest Man in Babylon]]